Superheros and Supervillains is a set of miniatures published by Heritage Models.

Contents
Superheros and Supervillains is a 25mm miniature adventure gaming kit, which pits the four Knights of Justice against the Syndicate of Terror.

Reception
William A. Barton reviewed Superheros and Supervillains in The Space Gamer No. 42. Barton commented that "Though experienced miniaturists may wish to wait for these figures to come out in individual sets, superhero fans who wish to break into miniatures will find Superheros and Supervillains a solid introductory set, even for its [...] price."

References

See also
List of lines of miniatures

Miniature figures